The Merrimack Warriors men's basketball team represents Merrimack College in North Andover, Massachusetts, United States. The school's team currently competes in the Northeast Conference. They are currently led by 4th year head coach Joe Gallo and play their home games in Hammel Court at the Merrimack Athletics Complex.

In their first year at the Division 1 level, the 2019–20 team went 14–4 in NEC play and won the regular season title, despite in the preseason being picked by the media to finish 11th out of 11 teams.  Due to the NCAA's policy on reclassifying programs, the Warriors will not be eligible to compete in the NCAA tournament or the NIT until the 2023–24 season.

Season-by-season record
{| class="wikitable"

|- align="center"

Postseason

NCAA Division II tournament results
The Warriors appeared in the NCAA Division II Tournament eleven times.

References

External links
Website